Arif Suyono (born  in Batu, East Java) is an Indonesian professional footballer who plays as a winger, whose nickname is Keceng, refers to his skinny appearance.

Club career
Before plays in Mitra Kukar, he played in the team Sriwijaya, Arema Indonesia and Persema Malang. He is one of the Indonesian football players in the sector of wing midfielder or attacker. Prior to his career in the senior national team, he also had involved in the U-19 national team and played in the U-23 team for the Southeast Asian Games in 2007.

He is among the squad for Arema Malang to win the Piala Indonesia in two consecutive years, 2005 and 2006.

International goals

|}

Honours

Club honors
Arema 
Copa Indonesia: 2005, 2006
Indonesian Inter Island Cup: 2014/15
Indonesia President's Cup: 2017

Sriwijaya
Piala Indonesia: 2010

Country honors
Indonesia
Indonesian Independence Cup: 2008
AFF Championship runner-up: 2010

References

External links
Arif Suyono at Soccerway

People from Batu, East Java
Indonesian footballers
1984 births
Living people
Javanese people
Association football midfielders
Liga 1 (Indonesia) players
Arema F.C. players
Sriwijaya F.C. players
Persema Malang players
Mitra Kukar players
Indonesia international footballers
Sportspeople from East Java